Suljagić is a Bosnian surname. Notable people with the surname include:

 Emir Suljagić (born 1975), Bosnian journalist and politician
 Memnun Suljagić (born 1966), Bosnian footballer and youth coach

Bosnian surnames